Linden Hall is a former mansion house in the civil parish of Longhorsley, Northumberland, England which is now operated as a hotel and country club. This includes an 18-hole golf course built by English golf course architect, Jonathan Gaunt, which opened in 1997. The Hall has Grade II listed building status.

In about 1806 Charles William Bigge, a successful Newcastle banker, bought an estate of almost  at Longhorsley, which had been owned by the family of the Earl of Carlisle since the 12th century. In 1813 he built a mansion house on the estate for his own occupation.

He retained his friend, Sir Charles Monck, an amateur architect with a keen interest in the Greek Revival style, to design the new house with the assistance of the then newly qualified architect John Dobson.
He named the new house after an adjacent stream.

Financial problems later caused his descendants to sell the estate and Hall, which were sold in 1861 to H M Ames for £72500.

Thereafter the house provided a home for the Liddell, Ames and Adamson families until 1963. In 1978 it was sold to a company which converted it into a hotel.

References
 
Baglee,Christopher. Linden Hall a Concise History, 2006

External links
 History of Linden Hall
 www.burkespeerage.com

Grade II listed buildings in Northumberland
Country houses in Northumberland
Houses completed in 1813
Longhorsley